The March 86B was an open-wheel formula race car, designed, developed and built by British manufacturer March Engineering, for Formula 3000 racing categories, in 1986.

References

March vehicles
Open wheel racing cars